"Wanna be my lover" is a song lyric that may refer to:

Songs 
 Be My Lover (La Bouche song)
 Wannabe (song), Spice Girls